Olga Gulazyan (Armenian: Օլգա Նիկողայոսի Գուլազյան; 8 January 1886 – 27 May 1970) was a Soviet–Armenian actress of film and theater. Laureate of the Stalin Prize (1952) and the State Prize of the Armenian SSR (1967).

Career 
She was born on January 8, 1886, in Tiflis (now Tbilisi, Georgia). She graduated from the parish school of the Kharpukhi district in Tiflis.

She began her stage career at the age of 15. In 1900, she played the role of Nato in the play Another Victim by Gabriel Sundukian, receiving the author's encouragement. She began her professional career in 1901 in Petros Adamian State Drama Theatre in Tbilisi. Took part in performances at the Zubalov People's House, Araksi theater and in the Avjalyan auditorium. She later toured to Baku, New Nakhichevan, Moscow, St. Petersburg, Yerevan, Alexandropol and Shusha.

Gulazyan's distinctive art was formed as a result of joint work with great Armenian actors: Hovhannes Abelian, Siranush, G. Petrosyan and O.Maysuryan. 

In 1926, Gulazyan moved to Yerevan and became the actress of the Gabriel Sundukyan State Academic Theater. 

In 1955, she was elected deputy of the Supreme Council of the Armenian SSR of the IV convocation.

She died on May 27, 1970, in Yerevan. She was buried at the Tokhmakhskoye cemetery.

Works

Film

Theatre

References

Sources 

 Olga Gulazyan. "Memories" (1957). Yerevan.
 Bagdasaryan N. Olga Gulazyan (Collection-album about the People's Artist of the Armenian SSR) (1979). Yerevan: ATO.

External links 
 
 Olga Gulazyan at Open Library

1886 births
1970 deaths
Soviet actresses
20th-century Armenian actresses
Stalin Prize winners
Actors from Tbilisi
Soviet Armenians